USS Fallujah (LHA-9) will be an  of the United States Navy and the first ship to bear this name to commemorate the first and second battles at Fallujah during the Iraq War in 2004. On 13 December 2022, Secretary of the Navy Carlos Del Toro announced the name in a press release.

Design 

Fallujah will be the second Flight I America-class ship, and as such will include a well deck. The design of the Flight I America-class ships, including that of Fallujah, adopts a compromise, incorporating a slightly smaller aircraft hangar as well as smaller medical and other spaces to fit a small well deck for surface connector operations. The island structure will also be modified to free up more room on the flight deck to accommodate maintenance of V-22s, compensating for some of the lost aircraft hangar space.

Construction and career 
Fallujah is currently being built at Ingalls Shipbuilding in Pascagoula, Mississippi by Huntington Ingalls Industries and began fabrication on 19 December 2022.

Controversy over naming 
The ship's namesake comes from the first and second battle of Fallujah, which were notable for polarizing public opinion within Iraq. 

When announcing the name, Navy Secretary Carlo Del Toro said: "The name selection follows the tradition of naming amphibious ships after the U.S. Marine Corps battles, early U.S. sailing ships or legacy names of earlier carriers from World War II. It is an honor for me for our nation to memorialize the Marines, the soldiers and coalition forces that fought valiantly and those who sacrificed their lives during both battles of Fallujah".

The commandant of the US Marine Corps, Gen. David Berger, cited the battles of Fallujah as an American triumph. “Under extraordinary odds, the Marines prevailed against a determined enemy who enjoyed all the advantages of defending in an urban area. The Battle of Fallujah is, and will remain, imprinted in the minds of all Marines and serves as a reminder to our Nation, and its foes, why our Marines call themselves the world’s finest.” 

Journalist Peter Maas criticized the choice of naming, saying, "The announcement noted that more than 100 U.S. and allied soldiers died in Fallujah but said nothing about the far larger toll of Iraqi civilians killed, the flattening of swathes of the city through extensive bombings, the apparent war crimes by U.S. forces, the health impacts on civilians that continue to this day — and the inconvenient fact that U.S. forces were unable to keep their hold on Fallujah for very long."

Some notable Iraqis have also protested the naming choice; “The pain of defeat in Fallujah is haunting the U.S. military,” wrote Ahmed Mansour, an Al Jazeera journalist who reported from Fallujah during the fiercest fighting. “They want to turn the war crimes they committed there into a victory. … I was an eyewitness to the defeat of the Americans in the Battle of Fallujah.” 

Muntader al-Zaidi, an Iraqi human rights activist who famously threw his shoe at President George W. Bush during a 2008 press conference in Baghdad said, “It is insulting to consider the killing of innocent people as a victory,” Zaidi said. “Do you want to boast about forces that kill and hunt innocent people? I hope this ship will always remind you of the shame of the invasion and the humiliation of the occupation.” 

The Council on American-Islamic Relations issued a statement, “There must be a better name for this ship — one that does not evoke horrific scenes from an illegal and unjust war.”

References

External links
Huntington Ingalls Shipbuilding: America-class of Amphibious Assault Ships

America-class amphibious assault ships
Proposed ships of the United States Navy
Proposed aircraft carriers